Indus Towers Limited is an Indian telecommunications tower company offering passive infrastructure services to telecom operators and other wireless services providers such as broadband service providers. Incorporated in November 2006, Indus Towers Limited has been promoted under a joint venture between entities of Bharti Group including Bharti Infratel (rendering telecom and tower infrastructure services in India under the brand name Airtel and Bharti Infratel Limited respectively) and Vi (rendering telecom services under the brand name Vodafone and Idea) to render passive infrastructure services to telecom service providers.

Indus Towers Limited has over 175,000 towers and 319,100 co-locations and a nationwide presence covering all 22 telecom circles, it has the widest coverage in India and has already achieved 289,000 tenancies, a first in the telecom tower industry globally. Indus Towers Limited is formed by the merger of Bharti Infratel Limited and Indus Towers. This combined strength makes Indus Towers one of the largest telecom tower companies in the world. Some of its major customers are Airtel, Bharti Hexacom, Jio and Vi.

History 
Indus Towers Limited was founded in November 2006. It was incorporated with an objective to provide shared telecom infrastructure to telecom operators on a non-discriminatory basis.

Merger with Bharti Infratel 
In 2017, reports suggested that Bharti Infratel, who already owns 42% of Indus Towers, was looking to acquire the 53% stake in Indus Towers, currently owned by Vodacom Group Plc. However, in July, the head of Vodafone stated that they were "actively considering" a float of their stake in Indus Towers. Vodafone went on to deliver a formal mandate to both Bank of America Merrill Lynch and Morgan Stanley to finalize buyers.

On 25 April 2018, Bharti Infratel and Vodafone Group issued a joint statement announcing the merger of Bharti Infratel and Indus Towers to create the second largest telecom tower company in the world. Under the terms of the agreement, Bharti Infratel will transfer 1,565 of its own shares for each Indus Towers share valuing the latter at $10 billion. Other major shareholders in Indus Towers such as Idea Cellular and Providence Equity Partners would be provided an option to cash out. Bharti Airtel, the parent company of Bharti Infratel, will hold the largest stake in the newly merged entity. Prior to the merger, shareholding in Indus Towers was Bharti Infratel (42%), Vodafone Group (42%), Idea Cellular (11.15%) and Providence Equity Partners (4.85%).

References 

Companies based in Gurgaon
Indian companies established in 2007
Bharti Airtel
Companies listed on the National Stock Exchange of India
Companies listed on the Bombay Stock Exchange